Neuchatel Township is a township in Nemaha County, Kansas, United States.

History
Neuchatel Township was originally settled chiefly by French and Swiss immigrants. It was named after Neuchâtel, in Switzerland.

References

Townships in Nemaha County, Kansas
Townships in Kansas